Lester Harrison may refer to:
 Les Harrison (basketball)
 Lester Harrison (serial killer)

See also
 Les Harrison (disambiguation)